Foil Arms and Hog are an Irish sketch comedy group comprising Sean Finegan (Foil), Conor McKenna (Arms) and Sean Flanagan (Hog). The group performs on TV, radio, the stage, and online. The trio write, shoot, and edit a new sketch every week in their office, releasing it for YouTube, Facebook, and Instagram on IGTV. Foil Arms and Hog do not have a specific genre, and make sketches that are often observational and occasionally topical. Popular sketches released to YouTube include 'When Irish People Can't Speak Irish', 'An Englishman Plays Risk', 'WTF is Brexit', and 'How to Speak Dublin'. Foil Arms and Hog also perform live shows, primarily in Ireland and the United Kingdom, but also in the United States, Australia, the Netherlands, Germany, Switzerland, and a number of runs at the Edinburgh Festival Fringe.

The group's name evolved from nicknames each of the members had for each other, Foil (Sean Finegan) being the comedy foil, Arms (Conor McKenna) was 'All arms and Legs' and Hog (Sean Flanagan) because he ostensibly hogged the limelight.

The group formed in 2008, after the trio met in the drama society at University College Dublin, when they were studying architecture, genetics, and engineering respectively. They were drawn together at first by a love of the TV show Father Ted and a common interest in comedy. This was at a time just after the financial crash, and the group say that it "was absolutely the best thing that could have happened. If the Celtic Tiger had still been going and all our mates were making shedloads of cash, we would have been under pressure to get proper jobs. But instead, we had the perfect excuse to play around for a while and see what happened." Another result of the crash was the rent on the office they use for their sketches being far cheaper, which they say helped make their enterprise viable.

References

Irish comedy troupes
Comedy-related YouTube channels